Lists of shapes cover different types of geometric shape and related topics. They include mathematics topics and other lists of shapes, such as shapes used by drawing or teaching tools.

Mathematics 
 List of mathematical shapes
 List of two-dimensional geometric shapes
 List of triangle topics
 List of circle topics
 List of curves
 List of surfaces
 List of polygons, polyhedra and polytopes
 List of regular polytopes and compounds

Elsewhere 
 Solid geometry, including table of major three-dimensional shapes
 Box-drawing character
 Cuisenaire rods (learning aid)
 Geometric shape
 Geometric Shapes (Unicode)
 Glossary of shapes with metaphorical names
 List of symbols
 Pattern Blocks (learning aid)